Clockwork is a puzzle-platform game developed and published by Sydney, Australia based video game studio Gamesoft. The game has a steampunk theme and is set in a city in a dystopian future.

Plot
Clockwork is set in the dystopian future city of Watchtower; As Atto you try to get by day to day, until he discovers his watch is inhabited by the spirit of a girl known as Milli. Atto decided to return Milli to her creator, and the two need to work together to get through the dangerous obstacles of Clocktower with Milli's Mysterious power to reverse time.

Development
Gamesoft, a video game studio based in Parramatta, Sydney, Australia, began development of Clockwork in 2014. Vishal Gumber, the CEO of Gamesoft, said the game took two years to finish with a team of twenty five people.

Reception
Reviews for the game largely praise the art and soundtrack for being beautiful and bringing the steampunk work of Clocktower to life. However, bugs in the gameplay and some confused game design in the latter part of the game have caused mixed reviews on Steam.

References

External links

Official website
 IGN
 https://web.archive.org/web/20161105161318/http://twinfinite.net/2016/10/clockwork-review

2016 video games
Steampunk video games
Indie video games
macOS games
Puzzle-platform games
Video games developed in Australia
Windows games
Single-player video games